Gangarampur is one of the cities and a municipality in Dakshin Dinajpur district in the state of West Bengal, India. Buniadpur is the headquarters of the Gangarampur subdivision. The city is located on the bank of river Punarbhaba. Gangarampur is one of the major cities connected through National Highway 512. It became the subdivision of newly formed district Dakshin Dinajpur when Paschim Dinajpur was bifurcated into Uttar and Dakshin Dinajpur in 1992.

Geography

Location
It has spread linearly along the banks of the Punarbhaba River. It has an average elevation of 25 metres (82 feet). The area of the city is 10.29 Sq. km.

In the map alongside, all places marked on the map are linked in the full screen version.

Climate
Gangarampur has a Tropical wet-and-dry climate, with summer monsoons. The maximum temperatures can often exceed 38 °C (100 °F) during May–June. Winter tends to last from December to early-February, with the lowest temperatures hovering in the 4 °C (40 °F) to 8 °C (47 °F) range during December and January. Monsoon is the most notable phenomenon in the climate of the city. Maximum rainfall occurs during the monsoon in July–August.

Demographics
 India census, Gangarampur had a population of 56,175. Males constitute 52% of the population and females 48%. Gangarampur has an average literacy rate of 77%, higher than the national average of 74%: male literacy is 84%, and female literacy is 70%. In Gangarampur, 13% of the population is under 6 years of age.

Historic population

Education

Colleges
There are many colleges in the city limits: 
 Gangarampur College
 Gangarampur B.Ed College
 Gangarampur Government Polytechnic
 Vidyasagar Primary Teachers Training Institute
 Vidyasagar College of Education

Schools
There are many public and private schools in the city limits:
 Gangarampur High School
 Gangarampur Girls' High School
Kalitala Vidyasagar Shishu Niketan
 Holy Cross Primary School 
 Holy Cross Girls High School
 St. Joseph High School
 Kadihat Belbari High School
 Orient National School
 Chittaranjan English Medium School
 Samput School of Classical Dance
 Kids Hall
 Ujjwal Kids World
 Rabrindra Smriti Vidyapith
 Indranarayanpur Colony High School
 Shemrock Disha Play School
 Saraswati Shishu Mandir, Gangarampur
 Promod Dasgupta Smrity Vidyapith
 St. Pauls School
 Niranjan Ghosh Smriti Vidyapith
 Jamir Smriti Public Mission School
 Kabitirtha Bangla Academy

Economy
The economy of Gangarampur is driven by agricultural farming, small business, handloom and handloom based handicrafts. Important handloom potential areas are located in Boaldaha, Korial, Belberi-I, Belberi-II and various parts in Gangarampur Municipality area. Important handloom products include cotton ordinary saree, cotton Mala saree, ladies churidar set (churidars are tightly fitting trousers worn by both men and women in South Asia), gents kurta/panjabi and Shirting Than (Length of cloth) etc. According to the annual report published by Directorate of Textiles (Govt. of West Bengal) Bordangi (located near Gangarampur College) area has 588, where as rest of Gangarampur area has 252 looms.

Transportation
Gangarampur is connected to Kolkata, Siliguri, Jalpaiguri, Malda, Balurghat, Kishanganj, Cooch Behar, Bardhaman, Asansol, Raiganj, Durgapur, Nadia,and other major places in West Bengal and Bihar by both bus and train services.

Bus
The only State highway passes through Gangarampur is State Highway 10 (West Bengal). The state highway has recently been upgraded into National Highway 512 (India) by Government of India. This highway connects Gangarampur with National Highway 12 (India), which is the only other National Highway in Dakshin Dinajpur. This newly upgraded 96 kilometers long National Highway is stretched from Gazole to Hilli (near Indo/Bangladesh).  Both private and public night bus services to Kolkata, Siliguri, Jalpaiguri, Cooch Behar are available. Buses to Balurghat, Raiganj and Malda run frequently throughout the day. Recently the New Bus Terminal near the old one was inaugurated.

Train

Gangarampur Railway Station was built earlier in 2004 and the first train ran on 30 December 2004. The station is located at the south side of the city near Gangarampur College. Few express trains like Howrah–Balurghat Express, Tebhaga Express(Balurghat-Kolkata), Gour Express(Balurghat-Sealdah),Balurghat-Siliguri Intercity Express stops at Gangarampur Railway Station.

Health
The subdivisional hospital is located at the eastern side of the city near Kaldighi. The hospital runs with 250 beds. For improvement of overall health care services in Dakshin Dinajpur district many intervention-specific projects/programmes like improvement of infrastructural facilities in the secondary level hospitals, reducing the prevalence of Malaria, creating awareness about HIV, to look after the reproductive and child health of the below poverty line people in the municipal areas, providing free treatment/medicine to them etc. are taken under consideration. Gangarampur Super Speciality Hospital is now #2 Hospital in Dakshin Dinajpur district. Balurghat superspeciality hospital has 10 floor.#1. Balurghat district hospital is just 35 km from Gangarampur. Gangarampur Ghosh Medical Hall & Ghosh Sonoscan Centre is one of best & reputated pharmaceutical stores & leading healthcare centre among the whole district.

Banking facilities
There are many Public Sector Banks, Private Sector Banks, Co-operative Banks & Regional Rural Bank in Gangarampur. Many bank ATMs are also available 24 hours for cash withdrawn in the every corner of Gangarampur City.

Sports

The favourite sports in Gangarampur are cricket and football like other parts of West Bengal. As in the rest of India, cricket is popular in Gangarampur and is played on grounds and in streets throughout the city. The Football Club ground, a vast field that serves as the city's largest park, hosts several minor football and cricket games.

Gangarampur Stadium is located by the national highway (NH 512) near Kaldighi. The stadium was built in early twenty first century.

Balurghat DSA is just 35 km from gangarampur

Language
Bengali is the main language of Gangarampur. The principal communities are Hindus and Muslims, constituting the major portion of the population. There are many temples, mosques and churches around the city for religious practice.

Attractions

Bangarh

Bangarh is the site of an archaeological dig, where work commenced in 1938 on uncovering remains of structures dating from the pre-Maurya Empire (326 BCE–180 BCE) to the Pala Empire (8th to 12th century).

Kaldighi
Kaldighi Lake and Dhaldighi Lake, located at the east side of the city, are home to migratory birds and freshwater fish. The lakes are a tourist attraction as well as a source of revenue for local fishermen.

Dargah of Shah Ata

The building was probably constructed in the 14th century. The building is a brick and stone mausoleum, the burial site of Mollah Atar-Uddin or Shah Ata.

Parks
There are three main parks in the area, Kalitala Children Park, Kaldighi Park and Gangarampur Shishu Udyan

The first of these, Kalitala Children Park ( is owned by Gangarampur Municipality, and is located at National Highway 512 and adjacent with Punarbhaba River in Gangarampur city.

Movie theater
There are two movie theaters showing Bengali and Hindi movies.

See also
Gangarampur College
Gangarampur Railway Station
Bangarh
Gangarampur Government Polytechnic 
Kaldighi
Gangarampur Stadium

References

 
Cities and towns in Dakshin Dinajpur district
Dakshin Dinajpur district
Cities in West Bengal